The Press-Telegram is a paid daily newspaper published in Long Beach, California. Coverage area for the Press-Telegram includes Long Beach, Lakewood, Signal Hill, Artesia, Bellflower, Cerritos, Compton, Downey, Hawaiian Gardens, Lynwood, Norwalk and Paramount.

History

The Press-Telegram's precursor, the Press, was first published in 1897. The Press was purchased in the early 20th century by Charles H. Prisk and William F. Prisk, Charles being the owner and William the editor and publisher. Sometime after 1918 the Press was merged with another paper, the Daily Telegram; the combined paper was first published under the name Daily Press, then, from 1924, the Press-Telegram.

On September 30, 1933, the Press-Telegram published what David Dayen called "One of the more influential letters to the editor in American history": Francis Townsend's letter outlining the Townsend Plan, a proposal that sparked a national campaign which influenced the establishment of the Roosevelt administration's Social Security system.

In 1952, the Independent (founded in 1938) merged with the Press-Telegram, with the Independent becoming the newspaper's morning edition and the Press-Telegram the evening edition. They had a combined circulation of approximately 243,000 at their peak in the late 1960s, under publisher Daniel Ridder and executive editor Miles Sines, making them the second largest printed news source in the Los Angeles area, behind the Los Angeles Times and ahead of the strike-decimated Herald-Examiner. During this period, the Long Beach papers employed a number of journalists who would go on to prominent careers at other publications, including David Shaw, who received a Pulitzer Prize while working at the Los Angeles Times, Ross Newhan and Rich Roberts (Los Angeles Times), John Cash (Las Vegas Sun) and Bill Wasserzieher (Village Voice). The Independent was discontinued in 1981 after circulation slipped during the 1970s, leaving the Press-Telegram (now published in the morning) as the paper's only edition. 

The paper was owned by Ridder Publications and its successor Knight Ridder from 1952 to 1997, when it was acquired by its current owner, the Los Angeles Newspaper Group (then a division of newspaper conglomerate MediaNews Group). In 2013, MediaNews Group and 21st Century Media merged into Digital First Media.

An online version of the paper began web publication in 1995. In 2011, the paper eliminated its sports, photography, and features departments. Some of the eliminated positions were picked up by the Torrance Daily Breeze, another Los Angeles Newspaper Group paper.

The paper's longtime home, the Press-Telegram building at 6th Street and Pine Avenue, was sold in late 2006 to real estate developers intending to convert the property into condominiums. The paper's operations were moved to the Arco Center in Downtown Long Beach. The building at 6th Street and Pine Avenue in Downtown Long Beach occupied nearly the entire block, and at one time encompassed the entire production of the paper, including the presses, which were formerly visible behind glass windows at street level. The old building on Pine Avenue was eventually acquired and redeveloped by Molina Healthcare. The paper is currently located at 5225 E. Second St., Suite 400, Long Beach, CA 90803.

For the 2016 presidential election, the paper chose to endorse no candidate. This was later repeated in the 2020 cycle.

For the 2021 California recall election, the paper joined its fellow members of the Southern California News Group and endorsed the recall, while also endorsing Republican Larry Elder to replace Democratic Governor Gavin Newsom.

References

External links

The Long Beach Press-Telegram
 Latest Headline of Paper

Daily newspapers published in Greater Los Angeles
Mass media in Long Beach, California
MediaNews Group publications
Lakewood, California
Artesia, California
Bellflower, California
Cerritos, California
Downey, California
Norwalk, California
Paramount, California
Publications established in 1897
1897 establishments in California
Digital First Media